The 1982 Campeonato Nacional was Chilean football league top tier’s  50th season. Cobreloa was the tournament’s champion, winning its second title.

League table

Results

Topscorer

Liguilla Pre-Copa Libertadores

Promotion/relegation Liguilla

See also 
 1982 Copa Polla Gol

References

External links 
ANFP 
RSSSF Chile 1982

Primera División de Chile seasons
Chile
Prim